British Sounds (also known as See You at Mao) is an hour-long film shot in February 1969 for television, written and directed by Jean-Luc Godard and Jean-Henri Roger, and produced by Irving Teitelbaum and Kenith Trodd. London Weekend Television refused to screen it owing to its controversial content, but it was subsequently shown with success in cinemas. Godard credited the film as being made by 'Comrades of the Dziga-Vertov group'.

References

External links 
 British Sounds at Vimeo
 
 
 

1969 television films
1969 films
Films directed by Jean-Luc Godard
Films directed by Jean-Henri Roger
British avant-garde and experimental films
British television films
1960s British films